Roque Carranza (b. 1919 - d. 1986) was an Argentine politician, who served as minister of defense during the presidency of Raúl Alfonsín.

References

Defense ministers of Argentina
Radical Civic Union politicians
Burials at La Recoleta Cemetery
1919 births
1986 deaths